The 2014–15 SC Paderborn 07 season was the club's first ever season in the Bundesliga.

Summary
After four rounds of the season, Paderborn were leading the Bundesliga table on eight points after two wins and two draws.

Current squad

Players out on loan

Transfers

In

Out

Competitions

Bundesliga

League table

Results summary

Results by round

Matches

DFB-Pokal

References

External links
2014–15 season at Soccerway

Paderborn 07
SC Paderborn 07 seasons